Tamale Metropolitan District is one of the sixteen districts in Northern Region, Ghana. Originally created as a municipal district assembly in 1988 when it was known as Tamale Municipal District, which was created from the former West Dagomba District Council, until it was elevated to metropolitan district assembly status in August 2004. Later, a small northern part of the district was split off to create Sagnarigu District on 24 June 2012 (which it later was elevated to municipal district assembly status on 15 March 2018 to become Sagnarigu Municipal District); thus the remaining part has been retained as Tamale Metropolitan District. The metropolis is located in the northwest part of Northern Region and has Ghana as its capital city (which is also the capital city of the Northern Region). The metro poly is the central business hub of the region.

Demographics

It has population of about 233252 as of 2010. The population living in urban localities (80.08%) is higher than that living rural localities (19.1%) of the metropolis. the number of women is also high than that of the men.

Location

See also

 Russian Bungalows
 Dimala

Sources
 
  GhanaDistricts.com
Ghana statistical service

References

Tamale, Ghana
Districts of the Northern Region (Ghana)
Dagbon